In mathematics, a handle decomposition of an m-manifold M is a union

A handle decomposition is to a manifold what a CW-decomposition is to a topological space—in many regards the purpose of a handle decomposition is to have a language analogous to CW-complexes, but adapted to the world of smooth manifolds. Thus an i-handle is the smooth analogue of an i-cell. Handle decompositions of manifolds arise naturally via Morse theory. The modification of handle structures is closely linked to Cerf theory.

Motivation
Consider the standard CW-decomposition of the n-sphere, with one zero cell and a single n-cell.

The problem with CW-decompositions is that the attaching maps for cells do not live in the world of smooth maps between manifolds. The germinal insight to correct this defect is the tubular neighbourhood theorem. The vital issue here is that the gluing map is a diffeomorphism.

Handle decompositions are an invention of Stephen Smale. Let .

One says a manifold N is obtained from M by attaching j-handles if the union of M with finitely many j-handles is diffeomorphic to N.  The definition of a handle decomposition is then as in the introduction.  Thus, a manifold has a handle decomposition with only 0-handles if it is diffeomorphic to a disjoint union of balls.  A connected manifold containing handles of only two types (i.e.: 0-handles and j-handles for some fixed j) is called a handlebody.

Terminology

When forming M union a j-handle 

 is known as the attaching sphere.

 is sometimes called the framing of the attaching sphere, since it gives trivialization of its normal bundle.

Cobordism presentations

A handle presentation of a cobordism consists of a cobordism W where  and an ascending union

Whereas handle decompositions are the analogue for manifolds what cell decompositions are to topological spaces, handle presentations of cobordisms are to manifolds with boundary what relative cell decompositions are for pairs of spaces.

Morse theoretic viewpoint

Given a Morse function  on a compact boundaryless manifold M, such that the critical points  of f satisfy , and provided

then for all j,  is diffeomorphic to  where I(j) is the index of the critical point . The index I(j) refers to the dimension  of the maximal subspace of the tangent space  where the Hessian is negative definite.

Provided the indices satisfy   this is a handle decomposition of M, moreover, every manifold has such Morse functions, so they have handle decompositions.

When f is a Morse function on M, -f is also a Morse function.  The corresponding handle decomposition / presentation is called the dual decomposition.

Some major theorems and observations

 A Heegaard splitting of a closed, orientable 3-manifold is a decomposition of a 3-manifold into the union of two (3,1)-handlebodies along their common boundary, called the Heegaard splitting surface.  Heegaard splittings arise for 3-manifolds in several natural ways: given a handle decomposition of a 3-manifold, the union of the 0 and 1-handles is a (3,1)-handlebody, and the union of the 3 and 2-handles is also a (3,1)-handlebody (from the point of view of the dual decomposition), thus a Heegaard splitting.  If the 3-manifold has a triangulation T, there is an induced Heegaard splitting where the first (3,1)-handlebody is a regular neighbourhood of the 1-skeleton , and the other (3,1)-handlebody is a regular neighbourhood of the dual 1-skeleton.
 When attaching two handles in succession , it is possible to switch the order of attachment, provided , i.e.: this manifold is diffeomorphic to a manifold of the form  for suitable attaching maps.
This is the primary link between surgery, handles and Morse functions.
For example, it's known that every 3-manifold bounds a 4-manifold (similarly oriented and spin 3-manifolds bound oriented and spin 4-manifolds respectively) due to René Thom's work on cobordism. Thus every 3-manifold can be obtained via surgery on framed links in the 3-sphere. In the oriented case, it's conventional to reduce this framed link to a framed embedding of a disjoint union of circles.
 The H-cobordism theorem is proven by simplifying handle decompositions of smooth manifolds.

See also

Casson handle
Cobordism theory
CW complex
Handlebody
Kirby calculus
Manifold decomposition

References

Notes

General references
 A. Kosinski, Differential Manifolds Vol 138 Pure and Applied Mathematics, Academic Press (1992).
 Robert Gompf and Andras Stipsicz, 4-Manifolds and Kirby Calculus, (1999) (Volume 20 in Graduate Studies in Mathematics), American Mathematical Society, Providence, RI 

Geometric topology